Brian Lee Kelley (born September 1, 1951) is a former American football linebacker who played his entire professional career in the National Football League (NFL) for the New York Giants (1973–1983) after being drafted in the 14th round of the 1973 NFL Draft.

Kelley grew up in Fullerton, California, where he was an outstanding athlete at Sunny Hills High School. He attended California Lutheran University, a National Association of Intercollegiate Athletics (NAIA) member and played college football. Cal Lutheran won the NAIA National Championship in Kelley's junior year, but in his senior year, they lost, even though Kelley was named MVP of the championship game. He was also honored as a little All-American.  On May 11, 2010, Kelley was elected into the College Football Hall of Fame.

As a member of the Giants, Kelley was one of the Crunch Bunch, a team of fierce linebackers composed of Kelley, Brad Van Pelt, Lawrence Taylor, and Harry Carson.  The group is widely considered one of the best linebacking combos in NFL history.

College career  
Kelley had played defensive end and tight end at Sunny Hills High School in Fullerton, California prior to college. For college, Kelley played linebacker for Cal Lutheran Kingsmen in Thousand Oaks, CA, a team he helped to win the NAIA National Championship in his junior year in 1971. He was selected by the Associated Press as a first-team linebacker on the 1972 Little All-America college football team. Kelley, at 6’3” and 225 lbs was drafted for the New York Giants after assistant Jim Garrett had seen him play. He was named the team's most valuable player in the NAIA Championship and was selected to the NAIA All-America First-team as well as the NAIA District 3 Defensive First-team and the All-Lutheran College Defensive First-team. He was inducted into the CLU Athletics Hall of Fame in 2003. After CLU, he played for eleven seasons starting as a linebacker for the New York Giants. Besides football, Kelley was also a member of the university's wrestling program and was named the NAIA District III heavyweight wrestling champion in 1970. He became CLU's first College Football Hall of Fame inductee after his induction in 2010. He finished his college career with seventeen interceptions, which was a school record, and as a punter averaging 34.6 yards per punt.

References

1951 births
Living people
American football linebackers
Cal Lutheran Kingsmen football players
New York Giants players
College Football Hall of Fame inductees
Players of American football from Dallas
Sportspeople from Fullerton, California
Players of American football from California